Liz Cruz may refer to:

 Liz Cruz (Nip/Tuck), a fictional character in the American television series Nip/Tuck
 "Liz Cruz" (Nip/Tuck episode), an episode of the American television series Nip/Tuck
 Liz Cruz (tennis) (born 1985), Salvadoran tennis player

Cruz, Liz